"The Dead Line" is the last of four radio dramas released prior to the third series of Torchwood, a British science fiction television series which airs on the BBC. "The Dead Line aired as BBC Radio 4's Afternoon Play on 3 July 2009, and features the series' regular cast.

Plot

In the early hours of the morning, Professor Stella Courtney receives a phone call from Ianto Jones. Confused as to why she is being called, Ianto reveals that Captain Jack Harkness needs Professor Courtney's help as he is dying.

At St. Helen's hospital, Gwen Cooper leads Stella to where Jack's body lay. She remarks that Jack cannot die, to which Gwen remarks that what Jack is suffering through is worse than death itself. Upon seeing the body and meeting Ianto, Stella comes to the conclusion that Jack is more entranced than comatose; as his monitor is still relaying faint signs of activity. Stella is told that there are twenty other people in the hospital in the same condition as Jack, and it all started two nights ago when a man named Bob Roberts received a phone call in the middle of the night.

Two nights prior, Bob Roberts and his wife Jan are awoken by a phone call. Bob answers the phone at the urging of his wife, only to find a strange ticking sound on the other end. Assuming it is a prank call, Bob chastises the caller; only to collapse on the floor. By the time the Torchwood team are alerted, seven more cases across Cardiff have been recorded.

Gwen and Jack go to the Roberts' household to investigate and are met by a distraught Jan. While she attends to a phone call, Gwen and Jack examine the telephone used by Bob the previous night. Jack notes the vintage appearance of the phone while Gwen's scans reveal that there are faint signs of residual Rift energy. She concludes that if something alien is in the phone network, the whole of the city could be endangered. After promising Jan they'd do their best to return Bob to health, Gwen and Jack take the phone back to the Hub.

Gwen phones Rhys at work, warning him against using phones and rejoins Ianto and Jack inside the Hub, where Jack has accumulated all the phones involved in the cases across Cardiff. Gwen notices that all the phones are the same and Jack remarks that they're from the seventies, recalling his life back then. He mentions a junior doctor he dated back in 1975, Stella Courtney, and that he still checks in to see if she's okay. Jack remarks that the phone number which called all the victims was the same and that the number is '2059'. Intrigued as to why a phone number from thirty years previous is ringing people in 2009, Jack phones the number but gets no reply. Suddenly, the retro phones all ring simultaneously; and ignoring the pleas of Ianto and Gwen, Jack answers. He collapses upon hearing the strange ticking noise on the other end.

At the hospital, Jack's monitor signifies change in his brain activity. While Ianto stays with Jack, Stella and Gwen observe the other victims; Stella suggesting that their brains are all connected somehow, as the patients' monitors are reacting in unison. Gwen begs Stella to do her best in healing them as she leaves to investigate the cause behind the phone calls.

Upon meeting Rhys, who had been waiting at Roald Dahl Plass for her, Gwen relays the events to him and becomes emotional. Whilst eating breakfast, Gwen notes that everybody with a mobile phone is in danger and is effectively carrying a bomb. Rhys volunteers his help to Gwen though she initially opposes to it, only relenting after Rhys reminds her that he's helped Torchwood and Jack before.

Stella and Ianto muse over what could be connecting the victims together. Stella suggests that there is nothing physically wrong with Jack to cause his condition, that an electrochemical reaction to what came down the phone line is what has entranced him and the others. She also points out that whatever has done this to Jack and the others needs them alive for another purpose.

Gwen and Rhys, meanwhile, drive to the last residence holding the phone number ringing all the victims; an abandoned building society house, Maddock House. After breaking in, Gwen and Rhys discover masses of copper wiring and a dead body holding a phone. They confiscate the phone and contain it in a special crate kept in the SUV. They head to Swansea, where the Cardiff and West Building Society now stands in order to find out more about Maddock House.

As Ianto sits by Jack's bedside, he begins to talk to him like people would to loved ones in a coma. He tells Jack that when he wakes up, never to repeat what he is saying. Ianto proceeds to tell Jack about the times where he's watched him sleep and dream, and that he wonders what a man like himself could dream about. He goes onto admitting that he knows there will be a day when Jack would not come back to him but they would not have to worry about that problem as long as they work for Torchwood as no member lives to old age. Ianto tearfully refers to himself as a 'blip in time' to Jack, and because he hasn't left yet, he knows Jack will return to him.

In Swansea, Gwen and Rhys meet with Mr Tyler, who runs the Cardiff and West Building Society. He feigns ignorance about the telephone and after being pressured, asks Gwen and Rhys to follow him to a nursing home the company owns. There, Tyler introduces Gwen and Rhys to Jillian, who lies in the same state as the other victims. Tyler reveals that Jillian had been in that condition for 33 years, and that there have been others. Maddock House had been hit by a thunderstorm in the seventies which caused the phones to ring; and upon answering, people collapsed. The Cardiff and West Building Society took care of these people because they did not know how to explain the condition. Tyler reveals that the monitors at the nursing home reacted in the same way as the ones of the victims in Cardiff.

When Gwen and Rhys return to the hospital, more cases of people collapsing are occurring, and after regrouping with Ianto and Stella; they devise a way to combat the problem. Ianto links Gwen's PDA up with the Hub's computer system and rigs it up to an MRI scanner in the hospital. Using the phone retrieved from Maddock House, Ianto breaks the connection and brings the victims out of their trances.

When Jack and the others awaken, they have no real effects except for no memory of what happened. After a brief reunion with Jack, Stella says her goodbyes and leaves with Gwen. Alone, Ianto asks Jack if he remembers anything about his trance. Jack replies that he didn't and asks Ianto if he spoke to him while he was unconscious. Ianto says he did but not much as he is not a big talker. Jack accepts this, seemingly to Ianto's relief, before stating that Ianto will never be just 'a blip' in time for him.

Continuity
Doña Croll, the actress who played Stella, also had a part in parent series Doctor Who as Matron Casp in the episode "New Earth".
References are made to previous Torchwood episodes when Rhys is persuading Gwen to let him help. He mentions going undercover in "Meat" and defending Gwen in "Something Borrowed".

Outside references
Rhys's response to Gwen telling him that Jack was attacked by the virus in the phone network was "Jack? But I thought he was indestructible, like Captain Scarlet, or something".  The play's writer, Phil Ford, was the head writer on Gerry Anderson's New Captain Scarlet.

References

External links
Torchwood Website
Torchwood Radio Play
Torchwood Radio Play – The Dead Line

Radio plays based on Torchwood
2009 radio dramas
2009 audio plays